Pak Seung-zin (a.k.a. Pak Sung Jin; 11 January 19415 August 2011) was a North Korean footballer. He represented North Korea at the 1966 FIFA World Cup in England, scoring two goals, against Chile and Portugal. He was the first Asian footballer to score a goal in the World Cup finals.

Career

In his book, The Aquariums of Pyongyang,  North Korean defector Kang Chol-hwan claimed that he met Pak in the Yodok concentration camp. He says that Pak and other players on the 1966 team were imprisoned for celebrating the team's victory over Italy in a bar, which was seen as "a sign of bourgeois decadence" by North Korean officials. According to Kang, Pak was in the camp for over 20 years. However, in the documentary film The Game of Their Lives, Pak and the other players were interviewed and denied there had been any retribution.

References

1941 births
2011 deaths
Association football forwards
North Korean footballers
North Korea international footballers
1966 FIFA World Cup players
Moranbong Sports Club players